Kim Dong-hyun (born September 9, 1988), anglicized as Dong Hyun Kim, also known as "The Maestro", is a South Korean mixed martial artist who most recently competed in the UFC's lightweight division. At the turn of 2019, he began to use the ring name Ma Dong-hyun (anglicized as
Dong Hyun Ma; "Ma" as in "Maestro") to better distinguish himself from fellow South Korean mixed martial artist "Stun Gun" Kim Dong-hyun.

Mixed martial arts career

Early career
Ma began his professional MMA career in March 2007. Over the next eight years, he split his time between his native South Korea and Japan while fighting for promotions such as Spirit FC, Road FC and Deep. During this time he amassed a record of 13 wins, 6 losses and 3 draws.

Ultimate Fighting Championship
In his UFC debut, Ma replaced Hyun Gyu Lim against Dominique Steele on November 28, 2015 at UFC Fight Night: Henderson vs. Masvidal. He lost the fight via knockout due to a slam in the third round.

In his second bout for the promotion, Ma faced Polo Reyes on June 4, 2016 at UFC 199. He lost the back-and-forth fight via knockout in the third round. Despite the loss, Ma was awarded his first Fight of the Night bonus award.

In his third fight for the promotion, Ma faced Brendan O'Reilly on December 3, 2016 at The Ultimate Fighter: Tournament of Champions Finale. Ma won the fight by unanimous decision to earn his first UFC victory.

In his highest profile UFC fight to date, Ma faced Takanori Gomi on September 23, 2017 at UFC Fight Night: Saint Preux vs. Okami. He won the fight via TKO in the first round.

Ma faced Damien Brown on February 11, 2018 at UFC 221. He won the fight by split decision.

Ma faced Devonte Smith on February 10, 2019 at UFC 234. He lost the fight via technical knockout in round one.

Ma faced Scott Holtzman on August 3, 2019 at UFC on ESPN 5. At the weigh-ins, Ma weighed in at 158 lbs, 2 pounds over the lightweight non-title fight limit of 156 lbs. He was fined 20% of his fight purse to Holtzman, and the bout proceeded at catchweight. He lost the fight via TKO due to a doctor stoppage between the second and third round as the swelling on Ma's right eye rendered him unable to continue.

Ma faced Omar Morales on December 21, 2019 at UFC on ESPN+ 23. He lost the fight by unanimous decision.

On March 19, 2020, news revealed that Ma and the UFC had parted ways.

Championships and accomplishments
Top FC
Top FC Lightweight Tournament 2015 winner
Ultimate Fighting Championship
Fight of the Night (One time)

Mixed martial arts record

|Loss
|align=center|16–11–3
|Omar Morales
|Decision (unanimous)
|UFC Fight Night: Edgar vs. The Korean Zombie
|
|align=center|3
|align=center|5:00
|Busan, South Korea
|
|-
|Loss
|align=center|16–10–3
|Scott Holtzman
|TKO (doctor stoppage)
|UFC on ESPN: Covington vs. Lawler
|
|align=center|2
|align=center|5:00
|Newark, New Jersey, United States
|
|-
|Loss
|align=center|16–9–3
|Devonte Smith
|TKO (punches)
|UFC 234
|
|align=center|1
|align=center|3:53
|Melbourne, Australia
|
|-
|Win
|align=center|16–8–3
|Damien Brown
|Decision (split)
|UFC 221
|
|align=center|3
|align=center|5:00
|Perth, Australia
|
|-
|Win
|align=center|15–8–3
|Takanori Gomi
|TKO (punches)
|UFC Fight Night: Saint Preux vs. Okami
|
|align=center|1
|align=center|1:30
|Saitama, Japan
|
|-
|Win
|align=center|14–8–3
|Brendan O'Reilly
|Decision (unanimous)
|The Ultimate Fighter: Tournament of Champions Finale
|
|align=center|3
|align=center|5:00
|Las Vegas, Nevada, United States
|
|-
|Loss
|align=center|13–8–3
|Polo Reyes
|KO (punches)
|UFC 199
|
|align=center|3
|align=center|1:52
|Inglewood, California, United States
|
|-
|Loss
|align=center|13–7–3
|Dominique Steele
|KO (slam)
|UFC Fight Night: Henderson vs. Masvidal
|
|align=center|3
|align=center|0:27
|Seoul, South Korea
|
|-
|Win
|align=center|13–6–3
|Jung Min Kang
|Submission (rear-naked choke)
|Top FC 8: Heart of a Champion
|
|align=center|1
|align=center|4:07
|Seoul, South Korea
|
|-
|Win
|align=center|12–6–3
|Toshikatsu Harada
|TKO (punches)
|Top FC 6: Unbreakable Dream
|
|align=center|1
|align=center|4:51
|Seoul, South Korea
|
|-
|Loss
|align=center|11–6–3
|Kuniyoshi Hironaka
|Technical Submission (arm-triangle choke)
|Vale Tudo Japan - VTJ 6th
|
|align=center|2
|align=center|2:23
|Seoul, South Korea
|
|-
|Win
|align=center|11–5–3
|Suk-Young Lee
|KO (punch)
|Sun FC 2
|
|align=center|1
|align=center|0:45
|Busan, South Korea
|
|-
|Win
|align=center|10–5–3
|Rekson Rekson
|TKO (punches)
|King of Fight 4
|
|align=center|1
|align=center|0:10
|Jinju, South Korea
|
|-
|Win
|align=center|9–5–3
|In Ho Cha
|Submission (cattle catch neck crank)
|Road FC 3: Explosion
|
|align=center|1
|align=center|3:25
|Seoul, South Korea
|
|-
|Win
|align=center|8–5–3
|Yuta Nakamura
|TKO (doctor stoppage)
|Gladiator 18
|
|align=center|2
|align=center|2:15
|Fukuoka, Japan
|
|-
|Win
|align=center|7–5–3
|Yong Jae Lee
|Submission (rear-naked choke)
|KF-1: MMA World Competition
|
|align=center|3
|align=center|5:00
|Seoul, South Korea
|
|-
|Loss
|align=center|6–5–3
|Yoshitomo Watanabe
|Decision (unanimous)
|Deep 49: Impact
|
|align=center|2
|align=center|5:00
|Tokyo, Japan
|
|-
|Loss
|align=center|6–4–3
|Shigetoshi Iwase
|Decision (unanimous)
|Deep 48: Impact
|
|align=center|2
|align=center|5:00
|Tokyo, Japan
|
|-
|Win
|align=center|6–3–3
|Hiromu Nagado
|Submission (rear-naked choke)
|KOF: The Beginning of Legend
|
|align=center|1
|align=center|4:38
|Seoul, South Korea
|
|-
|Loss
|align=center|5–3–3
|Hidetaka Monma
|Decision (unanimous)
|Deep: Fan Thanksgiving Festival 2
|
|align=center|2
|align=center|5:00
|Seoul, South Korea
|
|-
|Draw
|align=center|5–2–3
|Vaughn Anderson
|Draw
|AOW 14: Ground Zero
|
|align=center|2
|align=center|5:00
|Seoul, South Korea
|
|-
|Win
|align=center|5–2–2
|Lubomir Guedjev
|TKO (doctor stoppage)
|AOW 13: Rising Force
|
|align=center|1
|align=center|4:38
|Seoul, South Korea
|
|-
|Draw
|align=center|4–2–2
|Sang Il
|Draw
|Spirit MC 18: The Champion
|
|align=center|2
|align=center|5:00
|Seoul, South Korea
|
|-
|Loss
|align=center|4–2–1
|Ho Jin Kim
|Decision (majority)
|Spirit MC 17: All In
|
|align=center|2
|align=center|5:00
|Seoul, South Korea
|
|-
|Win
|align=center|4–1–1
|Hoo Sun Lee
|Submission (guillotine choke)
|Spirit MC 16: Clash of Pride
|
|align=center|2
|align=center|1:31
|Seoul, South Korea
|
|-
|Draw
|align=center|3–1–1
|Jung Hwan Cha
|Draw
|Spirit MC 15: Come Back Home
|
|align=center|3
|align=center|5:00
|Seoul, South Korea
|
|-
|Loss
|align=center|3–1
|Yoon Young Kim
|Submission (armbar)
|Spirit MC Interleague 6: The Road
|
|align=center|1
|align=center|2:29
|Seoul, South Korea
|
|-
|Win
|align=center|3–0
|Ki Chool Jung
|Decision (unanimous)
|Spirit MC Interleague 5
|
|align=center|2
|align=center|5:00
|Seoul, South Korea
|
|-
|Win
|align=center|2–0
|Dae Gun Kim
|Submission (triangle choke)
|Spirit MC Interleague 5
|
|align=center|1
|align=center|2:45
|Seoul, South Korea
|
|-
|Win
|align=center|1–0
|Myeon Kwang Min
|Decision (unanimous)
|Spirit MC Interleague 5
|
|align=center|2
|align=center|5:00
|Seoul, South Korea
|
|-

See also
 List of current UFC fighters
 List of male mixed martial artists

References

External links
  
 

1988 births
Living people
South Korean male mixed martial artists
Sportspeople from Busan
Lightweight mixed martial artists
Mixed martial artists utilizing taekwondo
Mixed martial artists utilizing boxing
Mixed martial artists utilizing judo
Ultimate Fighting Championship male fighters
South Korean male taekwondo practitioners
South Korean male judoka